Scachs d'amor (Valencian for Chess of Love), whose complete title is Hobra intitulada scachs d'amor feta per don Francí de Castellví e Narcis Vinyoles e mossèn Fenollar, is the name of a poem written by Francesc de Castellví, Bernat Fenollar, and Narcís Vinyoles, published in Valencia, Crown of Aragon, towards the end of the 15th century.

Though the original was lost, a photograph of the codex has been kept at the Library of Catalonia in Barcelona.

The poem is conceived as a chess game in which the players are Castellví, playing White (in modern chess) (Mars Març, Love Amor, and red pieces in the game), and Vinyoles, playing Black (Venus, the Glory Gloria, and green pieces).  They debate about love, and Fenollar comments and establishes the rules. The opening in the game would, centuries later, be called the Scandinavian Defense. Notably, the game ends in a pure mate, which is a specific class of checkmate generally considered to be aesthetically pleasing. Green and red are still used in xiangqi as the colors for the pieces.

The poem uses the game as an allegory for love. Its structure is based upon sixty-four stanzas (the same as the number of chessboard squares), nine verses each. The stanzas are grouped three after three: The first stanza in the group represents White's move, the second one Black's move, and the third one a comment on the rules by the arbiter. The three stanzas in the beginning are an introduction and the last one is checkmate.

This is believed to be the earliest documented game of chess with the modern rules concerning the moves of the queen and bishop. However, it is unknown whether the complete modern rules of chess were in use as of this game, because neither player castled or captured en passant.

The game

White: Francesc de Castellví  Black: Narcís Vinyoles  Opening: Scandinavian Defense, (ECO B01)
Valencia, Crown of Aragon, 1475

1.e4 d5 2.exd5 Qxd5 3.Nc3 Qd8 4.Bc4 Nf6 5.Nf3 Bg4 6.h3 Bxf3 7.Qxf3 e6 8.Qxb7 Nbd7 9.Nb5 Rc8 10.Nxa7 Nb6 11.Nxc8 Nxc8 12.d4 Nd6 13.Bb5+ Nxb5 14.Qxb5+ Nd7 15.d5 exd5 16.Be3 Bd6 17.Rd1 Qf6 18.Rxd5 Qg6 19.Bf4 Bxf4 20.Qxd7+ Kf8 21.Qd8 

The game is not particularly well played: for example, instead of playing 6.h3 White could play 6.Bxf7+ or 6.Ne5 with a big advantage in both cases. However the game was in its infancy, and the moves allegorize the love affairs that constitute the basic literary plot. For this reason, the authors did not care much if the movements were technically good or bad, but if they harmonized with the development of the literary plot.

See also
Versus de scachis, the earliest known reference to chess in a European text
Chess in early literature
History of chess
Libro de los Juegos

References

Further reading
En el poema scachs d’amor del siglo xv se presenta la primera partida bajo las reglas del ajedrez moderno, (in Spanish)

External links

 The chess game
 Scachs d’amor by Bill Wall
 An English Translation of Scachs d'Amor
 A commentary on the game (video)

History of chess
Medieval Catalan literature
History of the Valencian Community
Chess in Spain
15th century in chess
Poems about chess
Scachs d'amor
Chess games